Newald (also Ross) is an unincorporated census-designated place in the town of Ross, Forest County, Wisconsin, United States. As of the 2020 census, its population was 70.

History
Newald was originally called Ross, for Charles Ross, a pioneer settler, and under the latter name was platted in 1905. The community was renamed Newald in 1906 in honor of a local landowner. A post office was established as Newald in 1905, and remained in operation until it was discontinued in 1985.

"A car of building material, including camp supplies, teams, sleighs, etc., was loaded out from here last Tuesday, enroute for the new town of Newald, some ten to twelve miles north of Carver, and on the line from Laona to Sauders now under course of construction.  Messrs. Newald [ Leopold J Newald ] and Isaacson of Gillett are the promoters of this new proposed metropolis of the north.  A hotel, store, mill, blacksmith shop and of course last but not least, a saloon, are already arranged for and will be in operation at the earliest possible time.  E. H. Greenthal, a young, level headed business man, well known here, will have immediate personal charge of the new town's affairs, he accompanying the first consignment of material for this new Eldorado, Tuesday." Source: - Gillett Times - Oconto Falls Herald January 27, 1905

Demographics

References

Census-designated places in Forest County, Wisconsin
Census-designated places in Wisconsin